SpiderTech powered by C10 was a UCI Professional Continental cycling team based in Canada that participated in UCI Continental Circuits races. The team was founded in 2007 by Cycle Sport Management.  The team obtained a UCI Continental licence for its first season (2008) under the name of "Team R.A.C.E. Pro" (TRP), "Team Planet Energy" (TPE) in 2009 and SpiderTech powered by Planet Energy (CSM) in 2010.  In December 2010 the team was granted a UCI Pro Continental licence for the 2011 and 2012 seasons under the name of SpiderTech powered by C10 (SPI).   In October 2012, the team announced that it would take a pause in 2013, since its title sponsor withdrew its sponsorship at the last minute leaving the team without choice to suspend its activities.

2012 Roster

2011 Roster

2010 Roster

2009 Roster

2008 Roster

Major wins
2008
Stage 1 Rochester Omnium, Ryan Roth
2009
Stages 1, 9a, 9b & 10 Vuelta a Cuba, Keven Lacombe
Stage 4 Vuelta a Cuba, Martin Gilbert
Stage 7a Vuelta a Cuba, François Parisien
Stage 7 Tour of Missouri, Martin Gilbert
2010
Stages 4 & 9a Vuelta a Cuba, Keven Lacombe
Stages 5 & 13 Vuelta a Cuba, Martin Gilbert
Stage 7a Vuelta a Cuba, Ryan Roth
Stage 11 Vuelta a Cuba, Guillaume Boivin
Stage 1 Vuelta a la Independencia Nacional, Bruno Langlois
Stage 6a Vuelta a la Independencia Nacional, Eric Boily
Stages 8 & 10 Vuelta al Uruguay, Martin Gilbert
Stage 2 Vuelta Mexico, Flavio De Luna
Stage 8 Vuelta Mexico, François Parisien
Stages 1 & 3 Mi-Août Bretonne, Guillaume Boivin
GP des Marbriers, Keven Lacombe
2011
Stages 4 & 6 Tour de Beauce, Svein Tuft
 Road Race Championships, Svein Tuft
 Time Trial Championships, Svein Tuft
Grote Prijs Stad Zottegem, Svein Tuft
Univest GP, Ryan Roth
 King of the Mountains Classification, Tour of California, Jonathan McCarty
2012
 Road Race Championships, Ryan Roth
Tro-Bro Léon, Ryan Roth
Overall Tour of Elk Grove, François Parisien

National champions
2011
 Road Race Championships, Svein Tuft
 Time Trial Championships, Svein Tuft
 U23 Road Race Championships, Hugo Houle
 U23 Time Trial Championships, Hugo Houle
2012
 Road Race Championships, Ryan Roth
 U23 Time Trial Championships, Hugo Houle

Sponsors
Argon 18,  Action Wipes, Blackberry, Bunkbreaker, Canada Goose, DZ-Nuts, Finishline, Giro, Gu,
HerbaLife, Hutchinson, Humberview Group, ISM, K-Edge, Oakley, Park Tool, Pearl Izumi, PRO, Shimano, Thule

References

External links

Cycling teams based in Canada
Cycling teams established in 2008
Cycling teams disestablished in 2012
Defunct cycling teams based in Canada
Former UCI Professional Continental teams